Nasser Bourita (born ) is a Moroccan diplomat serving as the Minister of Foreign Affairs, African Cooperation and Moroccan Expatriates since 5 April 2017.

Education 
Bourita was born in Taounate, Morocco. In 1991, Bourita obtained his bachelor's degree in public law from the Mohammed V University in Rabat.

Career 
Bourita joined the Directorate of Multilateral Cooperation at the Ministry of Foreign Affairs in Rabat in 1992. From 1995 to 2002, he was the first secretary at the Moroccan Embassy in Vienna. In 2002, he was head of the United Nations Main Organs Department. In 2002, he was also appointed advisor to the Moroccan Mission to the European Communities in Brussels. From December 2003 to 2006, Bourita was head of Division of the UN.

He was appointed Secretary General of the Ministry of Foreign Affairs and Cooperation in 2011 and then Minister Delegate to the Minister of Foreign Affairs and Cooperation in 2016. On October 7, 2021, Nasser Bourita was reappointed as head of Moroccan Foreign Affairs.

On 29 October 2022, Bourita arrived in Algeria, to participate in the preparatory meeting of foreign ministers for the Arab League Council. He also represented the king, at the 2022 Arab League summit and was welcomed by Abdelmadjid Tebboune.

On 11 November 2022, Bourita attended the 5th Paris Peace Forum. On 21 November 2022, Bourita met with the US Ambassador to Morocco, Puneet Talwar, at the Ministry of Foreign Affairs in Rabat.

Personal life
Bourita is married and has two children.

References

External link

Moroccan diplomats
1969 births
Living people
Foreign ministers of Morocco
Mohammed V University alumni
People from Taounate